Nepal Sambat, also spelled as Nepala Sambata, (Nepal Bhasa: ,) is the lunisolar calendar used by Nepali of Nepal. The Calendar era began on 20 October 879 AD, with 1143 in Nepal Sambat corresponding to the year 2022–2023 AD. Nepal Sambat appeared on coins, stone and copper plate inscriptions, royal decrees, chronicles, Hindu and Buddhist manuscripts, legal documents and correspondence.

Establishment
The name Nepal Sambat was used for the calendar for the first time in Nepal Sambat 148 (1028 AD).

Sankhadhar Sakhwa
The Nepal Sambat epoch corresponds to 879 AD, which commemorates the payment of all the debts of the Nepali people by a merchant named Sankhadhar Sakhwa in popular legend. According to the legend, an astrologer from Bhaktapur predicted that the sand at the confluence Bhacha Khushi and Bishnumati River in Kathmandu would transform into gold at a certain moment, so the king sent a team of workers to Kathmandu to collect sand from the spot at the special hour. A local merchant named Sankhadhar Sakhwa saw them resting with their baskets of sand at a traveler's shelter at Maru near Durbar Square before returning to Bhaktapur. Believing that the sand to be unusual if the workers were gathering it, he convinced them to give it to him instead. The next day, Sakhwa discovered his sand had turned to gold, while the king of Bhaktapur was left with a pile of ordinary sand which his porters had dug up after the auspicious hour had passed. Sankhadhar used the gold to repay the debts of the Nepali people.

Historical usage
An inscription on a stupa in Panauti is dated Nepal Sambat 866 (1746 AD).

Nepal Sambat has also been used outside Nepal Mandala in Nepal and in other countries including India, China and Myanmar. In Gorkha, a stone inscription at the Bhairav Temple at Pokharithok Bazaar contains the date Nepal Sambat 704 (1584 AD). An inscription in the Khas language at a rest house in Salyankot is dated Nepal Sambat 912 (1792 AD). In east Nepal, an inscription on the Bidyadhari Ajima Temple in Bhojpur recording the donation of a door and tympanum is dated Nepal Sambat 1011 (1891 AD). The Bindhyabasini Temple in Bandipur in west Nepal contains an inscription dated Nepal Sambat 950 (1830 AD) recording the donation of a tympanum. The Palanchok Bhagawati Temple situated to the east of Kathmandu contains an inscription recording a land donation dated Nepal Sambat 861 (1741 AD).

Similarly, Nepali merchants based in Tibet (Lhasa Newars) used Nepal Sambat in their official documents, correspondence and inscriptions recording votive offerings. A copper plate recording the donation of a tympanum at the shrine of Chhwaskamini Ajima (Tibetan: Palden Lhamo) in the Jokhang Temple in Lhasa is dated Nepal Sambat 781 (1661 AD).

Suppression

Nepal Sambat was replaced as the national calendar in Rana period of the Kingdom of Nepal. The victory of the Gorkha Kingdom resulted in the end of the Malla dynasty and the advent of The Shahs used Saka era. However, Nepal Sambat remained in official use for a time even after the coming of the Shahs. For example, the treaty with Tibet signed during the reign of Pratap Singh Shah is dated Nepal Sambat 895 (1775 AD). In 1903, Saka Sambat, in turn, was superseded by Bikram Sambat as the official calendar. However, the government continued to use Saka Sambat on gold and silver coins till 1912 when it was fully replaced by Bikram Sambat.

Revival
The campaign to reinstate Nepal Sambat as the national calendar began in the 1920s when Dharmaditya Dharmacharya, a Buddhist and Nepal Bhasa activist based in Kolkata, initiated a campaign to promote it as the national calendar. The movement was continued by language and cultural activists in Nepal with the advent of democracy following the ouster of the autocratic Rana dynasty in 1951. The demand to make Nepal Sambat a national calendar intensified with the establishment of Nepal Bhasa Manka Khala in 1979. It organized rallies and public functions publicizing the importance of the era as a symbol of nationalism. Nepal Sambat has also emerged as a symbol to rally people against the suppression of their culture, language and literature by the politically dominant ruling classes. The Panchayat regime suppressed the movement by arresting and imprisoning the activists. In 1987 in Kathmandu, a road running event organized to mark the New Year was broken up by police and the runners thrown in jail.

Reinstated as national calendar

The Nepal Sambat movement achieved its first success on 18 November 1999 when the government declared the founder of the calendar, a trader of Kathmandu named Sankhadhar Sakhwa (संखधर साख्वा), a national hero. On 26 October 2003, the Department of Postal Service issued a commemorative postage stamp depicting his portrait. A statue of Sankhadhar was erected in Tansen, Palpa in western Nepal on 28 January 2012.

On 25 October 2011, the government decided to bring Nepal Sambat into use as the country's national calendar following prolonged lobbying by cultural and social organizations, most prominently by Nepal Bhasa Manka Khala, and formed a taskforce to make recommendations on its implementation. All major newspapers now print Nepal Sambat along with other dates on their mastheads. New Year's Day celebrations have also spread from the Kathmandu Valley to other towns in Nepal as well as abroad.

Current usage
Nepal Sambat is used majorly among Newar people. The lunar calendar is used for celebration of festival and observation of rituals. Lalitpur Metropolitan City began ascribing Nepal Sambat dates along Bikram Sambat dates since the year 1140, i.e. mid 2020.

Lunar Calendar
The Lunar Calendar of Nepal Sambat or the Lunar Nepal Sambat spans from 354 to 378 days in a year.

Months of the year 
On regular years, there are twelve months. An intercalary month is added every three years to prevent the calendar from drifting with the seasons. Roughly in every two decades a month is reduced which makes eleven months a year.

New Year
New Year's Day falls on the first day of the waxing moon during the Swanti festival. Traditionally, traders used to close their ledgers and open new account books on the first day of Nepal Sambat. Newars observe New Year's Day by performing Mha Puja (Nepal Bhasa: 𑐴𑑂𑐩𑐥𑐸𑐖𑐵, म्हपुजा), a ritual to purify and empower the soul for the coming New Year besides praying for longevity. During this ceremony, family members sit cross-legged in a row on the floor in front of mandalas (sand paintings) drawn for each person. Offerings are made to the mandala, and each family member is presented auspicious ritual food which includes boiled egg, smoked fish and rice wine during the Sagan ceremony. Mha Puja and Nepal Sambat are also celebrated abroad where Nepali peoples have settled.

Outdoor celebrations of the new year consist of cultural processions, pageants, and rallies. Participants dressed in traditional Newar clothing like tapālan, suruwā and hāku patāsi parade on the streets. Musical bands playing various kinds of drums take part in the processions. Streets and market squares are decorated with arches, gates, and banners bearing new year greetings. The president of Nepal also issues a message of greetings on the occasion of New Year's Day. Public functions are held in which the prime minister and other government leaders participate. Marking a break from tradition, Prime Minister Baburam Bhattarai gave his speech at the New Year's Day program in 2011 in Nepal Bhasa.

Monthly cycle
The monthly cycle of Lunar Nepal Sambat is based on Hindu units of time. The month ends on the new moon and begins on the first day of the waxing moon. Each month is divided into thwa and gа̄ (Nepal Bhasa: 𑐠𑑂𑐰𑑅 / 𑐐𑐵𑑅, थ्वः / गाः). The period of waxing moon is called thwa and the period of wanning moon is called gaa. Each lunar phase is known as milа̄lyа̄ (Nepal Bhasa: 𑐩𑐶𑐮𑐵𑐮𑑂𑐫𑐵𑑅, मिलाल्याः).
The lunar phases are named as follows

Solar Calendar
Following the official use of Nepal Sambat in Lalitpur Metropolitan City, a solar version of calendar was devised from the year 1141 (C.E. 2020), intending to expand use of Nepal Sambat for official and administrative purposes.

Months of the year 
The Solar Calendar of Nepal Sambat or the Solar Nepal Sambat follows a consistent pattern of division of years.

Leap year
The leap year determination of Solar Nepal Sambat follows a similar pattern of determining leap year in Gregorian Calendar.

Milestones
888 Nepal Sambat (1768 CE) - Prithvi Narayan Shah's Gorkhali forces take Kathmandu.
926 (1806) - Bhandarkhal Massacre establishes Bhimsen Thapa as the prime minister of Nepal.
966 (1846) - Kot massacre establishes Jang Bahadur Rana as the prime minister of Nepal and the Rana dynasty.
1054 (1934) - Great Earthquake strikes Nepal.
1061 (1941) - Four martyrs executed by the Rana regime.
1071 (1951) - Revolution topples Rana regime and establishes democracy.
1080 (1960) - Parliamentary system abolished and Panchayat system established.
1111 (1991) - First parliamentary election held after abolition of Panchayat and reinstatement of democracy.
1121 (2001) - The king, queen and other members of the royal family are killed in Nepali royal massacre.
1128 (2008) - Nepal becomes a republic.

Gallery

See also

 Vikram Samvat
 Mha Puja
 Swanti (festival)
 Lunar calendar
 Lunar phase

References

External links
 Converter from Nepal Sambat to Gregorian Calendar
 Nepal Sambat website A 
 Nepal Sambat website B
 Jwajalapa

Newar
Sambat
Calendars
Specific calendars
Sambat

Calendar eras
Hindu calendar
Lunisolar calendars
Sambat
New Year celebrations

Time in Nepal